Willi Klein (18 February 1927 – 6 November 1997) was a German alpine skier. He competed in three events at the 1952 Winter Olympics.

References

1927 births
1997 deaths
German male alpine skiers
Olympic alpine skiers of Germany
Alpine skiers at the 1952 Winter Olympics
Sportspeople from Swabia (Bavaria)
People from Oberstdorf
20th-century German people